Towhid is a city in Ilam province, Iran.

Towhid may also refer to:
 Towhid, Golestan
 Towhid, Lorestan
 Towhid, Tehran